Paris in Love is an American reality television series which focuses on media personality Paris Hilton as she plans her wedding to Carter Reum. The 13-episode series debuted on November 11, 2021 on Peacock. In February 2023, the series was renewed for a second season by Peacock.

Premise
Paris in Love follows Hilton "through all the major milestones and highlights of planning a wedding. From her engagement party in New York, to bridal dress shopping, hunting for the perfect venues for the three-day celebration, the joint bachelor-bachelorette party in Las Vegas and the bridal shower hosted by Kathy Hilton".

Cast
Paris Hilton
Carter Reum
Kathy Hilton
Nicky Hilton Rothschild

Production
The series was produced by Warner Bros. Unscripted Television, in association with Shed Media, Telepictures and Slivington Manor Entertainment. It was executive produced by Mike Darnell, Lisa Shannon, Dan Peirson, Bridgette Theriault, Andrea Metz, Perry Dance, Paris Hilton and Bruce Gersh.

Episodes

Release
Paris in Love premiered on November 11, 2021 on Peacock, with the platform releasing the series' episodes on a weekly basis. The final episode was released in two parts on January 27, 2022. The series also aired on E!, from February 2, 2022 to April 26, 2022.

References

2020s American reality television series
2021 American television series debuts
Peacock (streaming service) original programming
Television series by Telepictures
Paris Hilton